The Kuwait women's national futsal team represents Kuwait in international women's futsal competitions and is controlled by the Kuwait Football Association.

History

Debut
the new established Kuwaiti women's futsal team for a starter they debuted at the 2008 WAFF Women's Futsal Championship hosted in Jordan, the tournament saw Kuwait plays its first official match against Jordan in which they were beaten with a score of 18 to nil, making it the Biggest defeat Kuwait has earned in its history, coming back for their second match against Palestine, they were trashed by the Palestinians as the matches end 11 to nil. such poor results led to the long inactivity Kuwait team suffered from.

New Era
A new era of women’s futsal finally arrived in Kuwait. After decades of neglect, Fatema Hayat was appointed in May 2018 as the first female Board Member of the Kuwait Football Association (KFA).
Under Fatema’s leadership, the Women’s Football Committee (WFC) set to work making significant strides in rapidly growing women’s futsal in Kuwait. After visiting and meeting with counterparts in Jordan and Bahrain to learn from their experience, the Committee also met with several FIFA representatives to strategize on the best way to move forward.
With FIFA’s support and funds in hand, the WFC hit the ground running and hired renowned head coach Shahrzad Mozafar to lead Kuwait women's national futsal team. Mozafar has extensive experience as a futsal coach and under her leadership, Iran won AFC Women's Futsal Championship twice, in 2015 and 2018.
To ensure a thriving program, the first-ever Women’s Futsal National League commenced in January 2019 and will conclude in May 2019. The league played an important role in helping Coach Mozafar pick players for the Kuwait Women’s National Futsal Team. After watching them play for their respective clubs, Coach Mozafar chose 17 players to represent Kuwait in women’s futsal.
The WFC wasted no time in scheduling friendly matches against Turkmenistan and Bahrain. These friendly matches helped players gain experience in competing in international matches and prepared them for the GCC Futsal Cup in November 2019, to be hosted by Kuwait, with the aim of participating in the Asia Cup 2020.
in 2020 The Kuwait Football Association (KFA) Women’s Committee created history when the Kuwait National Women’s Futsal League final between Kuwait Sports Club and Al Arabi Sports Club was broadcast live on national television for the first time ever in February, which marked a historical path towards improving women games in the middle east.
under the Iranian coach's guidance, Kuwait earned its ever first silver medal in 2022 GCC Games.
Kuwait returned to the WAFF Women's Futsal Championship in its 3rd edition hosted in Saudi Arabia. started with style earning the first three points after beating the Host by a score of 3 to 1. their second match against debutant Oman saw Kuwait getting their Biggest win by a margin of five goals. however going to the semifinals undefeated, Kuwait was shocked with a large loss against Iraq a twelve-Nil score. led to big criticism of the technical team.

Results and fixtures 

Legend

2008

2019

2022

Coaching staff

Current coaching staff

Current squad
The following players were called up for the 2022 WAFF Women's Futsal Championship from 16–22 June 2022.

Competitive record

AFC Women's Futsal Asian Cup

*Draws include knockout matches decided on penalty kicks.

Futsal at the Asian Indoor and Martial Arts Games

*Draws include knockout matches decided on penalty kicks.

WAFF Women's Futsal Championship

*Draws include knockout matches decided on penalty kicks.

References

Kuwait women's national football team
Women's football in Kuwait
Asian women's national futsal teams